Kmiecin  is a village in the administrative district of Gmina Nowy Dwór Gdański, within Nowy Dwór Gdański County, Pomeranian Voivodeship, in northern Poland.

The village has a population of 970.

Notable people 
 Georg Heinrich Ferdinand Nesselmann (1811 in Fürstenau – 1881) a German orientalist, a philologist with interests in Baltic languages, and a mathematics historian

References

Villages in Nowy Dwór Gdański County